Williams Gomes Vital da Silva (born 29 June 1986), commonly known as Williams Recife, is a Brazilian footballer who currently plays as a forward for FK Kukësi in the Albanian Superliga.

References

1986 births
Living people
Brazilian footballers
Brazilian expatriate footballers
Brazilian expatriate sportspeople in Albania
Expatriate footballers in Albania
FK Kukësi players
Kategoria Superiore players
Association football forwards